State Highway 39 (SH 39) is a New Zealand state highway that forms a western bypass of the city of Hamilton. Gazetted in 1999, it is a generally quicker route to get between Auckland and New Plymouth as well as connecting to the Waitomo Caves, just south of the SH 39 southern terminus.

Route
It veers south briefly before reaching a roundabout junction where it follows Te Kowhai Road westbound, eventually changing to Limmer Road. It shares a brief concurrency, turning left into SH 23, then immediately right back onto SH 39 southbound. Following Kakaramea Road, the highway passed through Ngāhinapōuri then the township of Pirongia. After Pironga the state highway intersects SH 31 to Kawhia. For the final 14 km the road is jointly designated SH 31 and SH 39 before terminating in the town of Ōtorohanga with SH 3.

SH 39 is classified as an 'arterial' highway under the One Network Road Classification.

The traffic flow records indicate that through traffic forms about half the flow, with traffic from Hamilton via SH 23 adding to the flow through Whatawhata and via Temple View and Tuhikaramea Rd adding to the flow through Ngāhinapōuri and from Kawhia adding a little to the flow at the southern end of SH 39.

Major intersections

Route changes 
SH 39's northern terminus has changed. In 2013 after the completion of the Waikato Expressway, Ngāruawāhia Section,  used to travel through Ngāruawāhia and Te Kowhai further north than currently. After the expressway was completed, the Waikato Expressway become the new SH 1. As the expressway is a faster route, SH 39 was diverted away from Ngāruawāhia to its current terminus at Te Rapa. The current route was temporarily designated SH 39A whilst it was being upgraded to highway status and in June 2014 this section become SH 39 and the old section revoked.
In July 2022, upon opening of the Hamilton section of the Waikato Expressway, SH 1 moved from its location via Mangaharakeke Drive onto the expressway. The old designation of SH 1 through Hamilton was renumbered SH 1C.

History 
In 1936/7 the road was declared a main highway under the Main Highways Act 1922 from Horotiu/Ngāruawāhia to Te Rore via Whatawhata and improvements made. At that time, AADT south of Whatawhata was 102. About 1970 SH39 was straightened and widened.

Floods 
The road runs close to the Waipā River for most of its length. Until the 1930s improvements, floods closed the road in 1904, 1907 and 1926.

Buses 
The only bus now using SH 39 is a very short section of the Raglan-Hamilton route. A bus route linked Pirongia, Whatawhata and Hamilton from 1926. In 1932 Lewis Hodgson took over and it was still running in 1942.

See also
 List of New Zealand state highways

References

External links
 New Zealand Transport Agency
NZTA Highway Information Sheet – Pirongia – Tihiroa (speed limits, widths, seal type, etc)

39
Transport in Waikato
Waikato District